Starting in the 1980s, proper Cantonese pronunciation has been much promoted in Hong Kong, with the scholar Richard Ho as its iconic campaigner. The very idea of proper pronunciation of Cantonese Chinese is controversial, since the concept of labeling native speakers' usage and speech in terms of correctness is not generally supported by linguistics. Law et al. (2001) point out that the phrase  laan5 jam1 "lazy sounds," most commonly discussed in relation to phonetic changes in Hong Kong Cantonese, implies that the speaker is unwilling to put forth sufficient effort to articulate the standard pronunciation.

Origins and influences
The promotion of proper Cantonese Chinese pronunciation is partly a reaction to lazy sounds adopted by the younger generations. These lazy pronunciation variants, or sound changes include:
merge of initial ng- and dark-toned null/glottal onsets, for example, pronouncing  (oi3) as ngoi3
loss of initial ng- on light-toned words, for example, pronouncing  (ngo5) as o5

The nine attested phonetic sound changes in Hong Kong Cantonese, or lazy sounds, in the format of the International Phonetic Alphabet (IPA) can be tracked in the following table:

To, Mcleod and Cheung delve deeper into these sound changes in contemporary Hong Kong Cantonese, and focus in particular on the four syllable-final consonants: [-ŋ], [-n], [-k], and [-t]. After conducting original research on the pronunciation of words containing these syllable-final phonetic changes, To et al. argue that syllable-final environment sound changes occur due to the tongue position at the preceding vowel, as it opts for maximum ease. Thus, their argument attests for two process: alveolarization (occurring in [-ŋ] > [-n] transitions and [-k] > [-t] transitions) and velarization (occurring in [-n] > [-ŋ] transitions and [-t] > [-k] transitions).

The following table shows the environments where the processes of alveolarization and velarization tend to occur:

Alveolarization tends to occur when there is a preceding mid-front or central vowel, and velarization tends to occur when the attested preceding mid-back vowel [ɔ] is present. The last example in table 2 indicates that the attested [ɪŋ] sequence does not change, as the position of the tongue for the high, lax, front vowel is already in close proximity to the position needed to make the velar consonants.

To et al.'s research presents that the process of co-articulation accounts for the birth of lazy sounds. In Hong Kong Cantonese at present, alveolarization is a more popular phenomenon than velarization, and the syllable-final alveolar consonants [-n] and [-t] tend to be preserved even when the preceding vowels prompt a tongue position that is further back. An example would be “dry” [kɔn]. It is rare for people to pronounce this with a syllable-final [-ŋ], although it still occurs, as 7.1% of adults tested by To et al. do this.

This result is presented alongside a ranking of attested preceding vowels of the [-ŋ]~[-n] pair that demonstrate the process of alveolarization, from least likely to have a succeeding alveolarized consonant, to most likely: ʊ = ɪ > ɔ < ɛ < ɐ < a < œ. The vowels [ʊ] and [ɪ] share the same percentage of alveolarization, resulting in a 0.0% chance of sound change, while the highest ranking vowel, [œ], resulted in a 37.5% chance of sound change.

TV and radio programs, including game shows, have been made to promote proper pronunciation. The campaign has also influenced the local media. Some news reporters and masters of ceremonies in Hong Kong have adopted the proper pronunciations.

Arguments
The proper readings promoted by Richard Ho are based on the fanqie spelling of Guangyun, an ancient rime dictionary reflecting the sounds of Middle Chinese. Ho states that, Cantonese Chinese phonology being the descendant of the Guangyun system, there are highly regular correspondences between the sounds of Middle Chinese and those of modern Cantonese Chinese. He also holds that the flat and sharp tonal distinction in Middle Chinese is the most important feature from which modern Cantonese Chinese should not deviate, especially when reciting ancient literature. He allows exceptions in some cases of colloquial speech, but not in any cases in reading ancient literature.

Ho's approach to pronunciation is prescriptive. For instance, talking about the wrong pronunciation of final consonants of the youth, he says: 

He expresses his attitude towards sound changes, when talking about the gradual merge of [n-] and [l-] initials in Cantonese Chinese: 

A major critic of Ho's approach is Wong Ting Tze. He calls Ho's prescriptive pronunciations demonic. One of his concerns is that Cantonese Chinese comprises six historical strata, not just the one represented by the Guangyun.

Media

Ever since the arguments made around the correct way of pronouncing Chinese characters in Cantonese, different media companies in China have used their own interpretation of the correct pronunciations when broadcasting.

Effects on Cantonese pronunciation
Changes in pronunciation in Hong Kong's Cantonese pronunciation have affected the Cantonese spoken in other regions, including Guangdong and Guangxi Provinces.

Variations in Cantonese pronunciation across different regions are still a major topic of discussion. Some are seen as too informal while others are seen as having other flaws.

See also
Cantonese phonology
Jyutping

References
To, Carol K.S., Sharynne Mcleod and Pamela S.P. Cheung (2015), “Phonetic variations and sound changes in Hong Kong Cantonese”, Clinical Linguistics and Phonetics, Vol. 29, No. 5. Taylor & Francis, 2015, pp. 333–353.
Richard Ho (1995),  (Records of Teaching Cantonese Pronunciation), Hong Kong: T. T. Ng Chinese Language Research Centre. 
_(2001),  (An Outline for Self-study of Cantonese Pronunciation), Hong Kong: Hong Kong Education Publishing Company.
Wang Tingzhi (2005),  (‘Please Don't Murder Cantonese’), Wen Wei Po, October 21, 2005.

Notes

External links
 Cantonese Culture Promotion Society, an anti-proper pronunciation organization, with related articles criticizing the idea of proper pronunciation 
 The Association for the Promotion of Proper Cantonese Pronunciation 
 A TV show of TVB promoting the proper pronunciation and the proper characters
A Chinese Syllabary Pronounced According to the Dialect of Canton  by Wong Shik Ling, a pronunciation guide of Cantonese Chinese championed by Richard Ho

Cantonese language
Cantonese phonology
Languages of Hong Kong